Khvor Khvoreh (also Romanized as Khowr Khowreh; also known as Khorkhora, Khor Khoreh) is a Kurdish village in Mokriyan-e Gharbi Rural District, in the Central District of Mahabad County, West Azerbaijan Province, Iran. At the 2006 census, its population was 1,270, in 222 families.

References 

Populated places in Mahabad County